Loukas Louka (born 15 May 1945) is a retired Greek Cypriot shot putter, born in Arnadhi.

He represented Greece at the 1972 Olympic Games, where he did not reach the final. He reached the final at the 1981 European Indoor Championships but recorded no valid mark. His personal best throw was 19.84 metres, achieved in April 1975 in Athens.

He later competed for Cyprus. In the summer of 1981 he was the third best shot putter in the season's list for the entire British Commonwealth. He became visiting Greek shot put champion in 1983.

References

1945 births
Living people
Cypriot male shot putters
Greek male shot putters
Olympic athletes of Greece
Athletes (track and field) at the 1972 Summer Olympics
People from Famagusta District